Chatri Rattanawong (born 5 December 1993) is a Thai professional footballer who plays as a forward for Thai League 1 club Samut Prakan City.

References

External links
 

1993 births
Living people
Chatri Rattanawong
Chatri Rattanawong
Association football forwards
Chatri Rattanawong
Chatri Rattanawong
Chatri Rattanawong
Chatri Rattanawong
Chatri Rattanawong
Chatri Rattanawong